Aplowite is a very rare mineral with the formula CoSO4•4H2O, a naturally occurring cobalt(II) sulfate tetrahydrate. It is the lower hydrate when compared to bieberite (heptahydrate) and moorhouseite (hexahydrate), and a higher hydrate when compared to cobaltkieserite (monohydrate). It occurs together with moorhouseite within efflorescences.

References

Sulfate minerals
Cobalt minerals
Monoclinic minerals
Minerals in space group 14